Frederica Going (August 13, 1895 - April 11, 1959) was an American actress that performed in Broadway plays.

Going's father is Frederick Going who was a Shakespearean actor. She performed in plays ever since she was child and has performed in multiple productions. The plays that she had performed in ranged from Shakespeare to musical comedy. Her Broadway performances include roles in Street Scene, For the Defense, Two on an Island, and A New Life which were all produced by Elmer Rice. She had a role in the 1938 educational film The Birth of a Baby.

References

External links
 
 
 
  Frank Fay and Frederica Going in a scene from Harvey

1895 births
1959 deaths
American musical theatre actresses
American Shakespearean actresses
American stage actresses
20th-century American actresses
American film actresses